Kitten is the debut album by American indie rock band Kitten, released on June 24, 2014 through Elektra Records. It received mixed to positive reviews from critics.

Track listing

Critical reception 
Kitten received mixed to positive reviews, with review aggregator Metacritic assigning the album a normalized score of 59 based on 4 reviews. The album was ranked number 16 on Rolling Stones list of the 20 Best Pop Albums of 2014.

Charts

References

2014 debut albums
Elektra Records albums
Kitten (band) albums